The Satisfiers of Alpha Blue is a 1981 American pornographic science fiction film directed by Gerard Damiano and starring Robert Kerman, Herschel Savage and Lysa Thatcher.

Plot
In a futuristic society called 'Alpha Blue', sexual needs are fulfilled by a computer. Griffin (Herschel Savage) is happy with this state of affairs and spends his time with prostitutes, but Algon (Robert Kerman as R. Bolla) longs for the good old days of love and romance. He falls in love with Satisfier 805, Diana (Lysa Thatcher).

Cast and roles
 R. Bolla – Algon
 Herschel Savage – Griffin
 Lysa Thatcher – Diana
 Sharon Mitchell – Hostess
 Annie Sprinkle – Satisfier
 Tiffany Clark – Hostess
 Hillary Summers – Holly
 George Payne – Mark

External links
 

1980 films
1980s pornographic films
1980s science fiction films
American science fiction films
Films shot in New York (state)
Films directed by Gerard Damiano
1980s English-language films
1980s American films